Ånge is a locality and the seat of Ånge Municipality in Västernorrland County, Sweden with 2,872 inhabitants in 2010.

Ånge is a railway junction where the northern main line railway (Norra Stambanan) connects with the central main line railway (Mittbanan). Ånge is also known in Sweden as "The Swedish version of Seattle" due to an impressive number of bands. Takida, The Grand Opening and Corroded are among many other bands from this area.

Sport
The following sports clubs are located in Ånge:

 Ånge IF
 Ånge IK

Notable people
Musical group Takida
Musical group The Citadel
Musical group The Grand Opening
Musical group Corroded
Musical group Kill Kill Pussycat!
Musical group Blowball
Football manager Lars Lagerbäck
Ice hockey player Samuel Påhlsson
Ice hockey player Elias Pettersson

References 

Municipal seats of Västernorrland County
Swedish municipal seats
Populated places in Ånge Municipality
Medelpad